Siahkalrud (also Romanized as Sīāhkalrūd and Seyāhkalarūd; also known as Oţāqvar) is a village in Siahkalrud Rural District, Chaboksar District, Rudsar County, Gilan Province, Iran. At the 2006 census, its population was 793, in 249 families.

References 

Populated places in Rudsar County